Per Knuts (1 June 1938 – 9 January 2022) was a Swedish middle-distance runner. He competed in the men's 800 metres at the 1960 Summer Olympics.

References

1938 births
2022 deaths
Athletes (track and field) at the 1960 Summer Olympics
Swedish male middle-distance runners
Olympic athletes of Sweden
People from Bengtsfors Municipality